Princess Claire of Belgium (born Claire Louise Coombs on 18 January 1974) is a British-Belgian land surveyor. She has been married to Prince Laurent since 2003 and is the sister-in-law of King Philippe of Belgium.

Early life
She is the daughter of Nicholas John Coombs (Bath, 14 April 1938), a British-born businessman, and his Belgian wife, Nicole Eva Gabrielle Thérèse Mertens (Ixelles, 20 June 1951). She has an elder sister, Joanna, and a younger brother, Matthew. In 1977, her family relocated to Dion-le-Val near Brussels in francophone Wallonia. She has therefore lived in Belgium since she was three years old.

Marriage and children

On 12 April 2003, she married Prince Laurent of Belgium, the second son and youngest child of the King Albert II of Belgium and Queen Paola of Belgium. The civil ceremony was held at Brussels Town Hall, and the religious ceremony at the Cathedral of Saints Michael and Gudula.

The couple have three children:
 Princess Louise Sophie Mary, born 6 February 2004 at Saint Luc University Hospital in Woluwe-Saint-Lambert.
 Prince Nicolas Casimir Marie, born 13 December 2005 (twin) at Saint Luc University Hospital in Woluwe-Saint-Lambert.
 Prince Aymeric Auguste Marie, born 13 December 2005 (twin) at Saint Luc University Hospital in Woluwe-Saint-Lambert.

The family live in Villa Clementine, in Tervuren.

Public life

Unlike Queen Mathilde and Princess Astrid, Princess Claire has no defined official role.

She occasionally appears in public accompanying her husband, generally in support of environmental causes or animal charities. She is also a leading patron of the Brussels Choral Society, which sang at the religious part of her marriage ceremony. She is also active in organisations related to the United Kingdom in Belgium. She is a member of the Board of Trustees at the British School of Brussels and actively attends charitable and commemorative events hosted by the British Ambassador to Belgium.

In March 2020, amid the large-scale outbreak of COVID-19, it was officially announced that Princess Claire had tested positive for the infectious disease, which is caused by a coronavirus called SARS-CoV-2.

Titles and styles

Coombs received the title Princess of Belgium from the King ten days before her marriage, by Royal Decree of 1 April 2003 (effective as of the date of the wedding, on 12 April 2003).

Honours

National
 : Dame Grand Cross of the Order of Leopold I

Foreign
 : Dame Grand Cross of the Order of the Crown
 : Dame Grand Cross of the Order of Merit
 : Dame Grand Cross of the Order of Infante Henry

References

External links
Her official webpage at the official site of the Belgian monarchy
 Princess Claire's ancestry

Belgian princesses
Belgian surveyors
1974 births
Living people
Walloon people
House of Saxe-Coburg and Gotha (Belgium)
Grand Crosses of the Order of the Crown (Netherlands)
Grand Crosses of the Order of Prince Henry
English surveyors
People from Bath, Somerset